"The Army's Full of Irish (A Man from Erin Never Runs, He's Irish)" is a World War I song written by Bert Hanlon and composed by Walter Donaldson. The song was first published in 1917 by M. Witmark & Sons in New York City. The sheet music cover depicts a soldier smoking a cigar flanked by eight soldiers with Irish names.

The sheet music can be found at the Pritzker Military Museum & Library.

References

Bibliography

1917 songs
Songs about Ireland
Songs about soldiers
Songs of World War I
Songs with music by Walter Donaldson